Joaquín Izuibejeres (born February 23, 1982, in Montevideo, Uruguay) is a Uruguayan professional basketball player. His jersey's number is 5. He is a longtime member of the Uruguay national basketball team, having played in the 2006 and 2010 South American basketball championships and the 2003 Pan American Games, and is currently (2015-2016 season) playing professionally with Trouville of Liga Uruguaya de Basketball.

References

1982 births
Living people
Uruguayan people of Basque descent
Sportspeople from Montevideo
Uruguayan men's basketball players
Pan American Games competitors for Uruguay
Basketball players at the 2003 Pan American Games
20th-century Uruguayan people
21st-century Uruguayan people